Jana Milčinski (born Jana Podkrajšek) (5 December 1920 – 13 April 2007) was a Slovene writer, journalist and translator.

She won the Levstik Award in 1986 for her popular science book Lukec dobi sestrico (Lukec Gets a Sister). She wrote a number of other stories and children's books, many with themes from the Second World War in Yugoslavia.

She was married to the poet and satirist Frane Milčinski Ježek.

Selected works 
 Pravljice za danes in jutri (Stories for today and Tomorrow), 1992
 To si ti, Nina (That Is You, Nina), 1988
 Danes, ko postajam pionir, pionirka (Today As I Become a Pioneer), 1988
 Matiček in Maja včeraj, danes, jutri in vsak dan (Matiček and Maja Yesterday, Today, Tomorrow and Every Day), 1986
 Lukec dobi sestrico (Lukec Gets a Sister), 1986
 Pisane zgodbe (Diverse Tales), 1976
 Zakaj sta Matiček in Maja zamudila pouk (Why Matiček and Maja Missed Class), 1972

References

1920 births
2007 deaths
Slovenian translators
Slovenian journalists
Slovenian women journalists
Levstik Award laureates
Writers from Ljubljana
20th-century translators
20th-century Slovenian women writers
20th-century journalists
Yugoslav translators
Yugoslav journalists